Association for Continuing Legal Education (ACLEA) is an international organization established in 1964 devoted to improving the performance of Continuing Legal Education (CLE) professionals.  It is based in Saint Paul, Minnesota.

External links
 Association for Continuing Legal Education (ACLEA)

References

CATALOG OF CONTINUING LEGAL EDUCATION...

Legal education
Organizations based in Saint Paul, Minnesota